The Vuković printing house was 16th century printing house established in Venice by Božidar Vuković.

In the first period, when printing was organized by Božidar Vuković, the editors and printers were Hieromonk Pahomije (1519–21) and Hierodeacon Mojsije (1536–40). In 1560 Božidar's son Vićenco Vuković inherited the printing house and for a year only reprinted his father's books. In 1561 he started printing his own publications. Initially they were edited and printed by Stefan Marinović and later by Jakov of Kamena Reka.

The books printed in Vuković printing house were srbulje, liturgical books in Serbo-Slavonic, the Serbian written language between the 12th century and the 1830s. Vuković printing house printed the largest number of srbulje and was the first printing house that printed srbulje on parchment. The books printed in Vuković printing house were distributed by Ragusan traders over the territory of Balkans under the Ottoman control, i.e. Belgrade, Nicopolis, Vidin etc. Mileševa was center for their distribution. They were  richly decorated, very popular and had significant influence on printers of books on Russian, Greek and Romanian language.

History 
In period 1519—1560 this printing house was owned by Božidar Vuković who engaged printers and organized printing in it. After his death in 1560 it was inherited by Božidar's son Vićenco who continued to organize printing of the books in it.

Under Božidar Vuković 
During Božidar's life this printing house was operational in two periods, in 1519/1520—1521 and in 1536—1540 and printed some of the first srbulje (Cyrillic books on Serboslavonic language, Serbian recension of Church Slavonic). In the first period 1519/1520—1521 three books were printed (Psalter, Liturgijar and Molitvenik or Zbornik). The editing and printing was done by Hieromonk Pahomije.

In second period 1536—1540 two books were printed (2nd edition of Molitvenik or Zbornik and praznični Minej or Sabornik). The most luxurious and lengthiest edition was Praznični Minej. In this second period the printing was done by Hierodeacon Mojsije.

The books printed in Vuković printing house under Božidar Vuković had rich decorations made by woodcut. Mileševa (a Serbian Orthodox monastery located near Prijepolje, in southwest Serbia) was center for distribution of books printed in Vuković printing house.

Under Vićenco Vuković 

In 1560 Bozidar's son Vićenco Vuković inherited the printing house. His father's books were so popular that until 1561 Vićenco had only published reprints of his fathers books, such as Oktoih Petoglasnik, and successfully sold them.

In 1561 Vićenco engaged Stefan Marinović to operate the printing press and first book he printed was Posni Triod. In 1566 Jakov of Kamena Reka printed the Book of hours (Часослов) of 710 pages.

Printing activities of Vićenco Vuković announced beginning of the decline of publishing and printing of Serbian books in Venetian Republic, although it had been risen on very high level by Božidar Vuković.

Legacy 

Books printed in this printing house significantly influenced, directly or indirectly, to Russian, Greek and particularly Romanian language printed books because some of Božidars woodcuts were copied by printers who printed books on these languages.

Notes

See also
 Goražde printing house
 Crnojević printing house
 Belgrade printing house
 Mileševa printing house
 Mrkšina crkva printing house
 Rujno Monastery printing house

References

Sources

Further reading
 

Serbian printers
History of printing
Medieval Serbian literature
16th century in Serbia
1519 establishments in Europe
1510s establishments in the Republic of Venice
Serbian Orthodox Church in Italy
Culture of the Republic of Venice
Mass media in Venice
Book publishing companies of Italy
Republic of Venice printers
Venetian Slavs